Hasan Gökhan Şaş (born 1 August 1976) is a Turkish football coach and former player, who played as a winger.

He is known for his time at Galatasaray and for his performance with the Turkey national team at the FIFA World Cup 2002, where he was voted into the All-Star Team. During both assignments, he played as a winger. He was suspended from football for six months in 1998 after doping testing returned a positive result for the banned substance.

Club career
Born in Karataş, Adana, Şaş began his club career with Ankaragücü in 1995.

Galatasaray
In 1998, Şaş signed with Galatasaray for $4.4 million, but almost immediately upon arrival, he was suspended from football for six months after doping testing returned a positive result for the banned substance Phenylpropanolamine.

Şaş regained his spot with Galatasaray in the 1999–2000 season, in which Galatasaray won the UEFA Cup title in 2000 over Arsenal, and went on to win the 2000 UEFA Super Cup.

In the Champions League competition in 2000–01, Şaş made 12 appearances for Galatasaray. He scored against Spain's Real Madrid and Italy's A.C. Milan as well as against the Brazil national team in 2002 FIFA World Cup.

At the end of the 2008–09 Super Lig season it was announced that Galatasaray would not be renewing his contract and after declining many contracts to play in Qatar and Saudi Arabia, Şaş announced his retirement from professional football.

International career

Hasan made 40 appearances for the Turkey national team from 1998 to 2006.

Coaching career
Şaş resigned from duty of assistant manager of Galatasaray on 11 May 2020.

Personal life
Şaş married Sibel Yalçın on 29 June 2003. They divorced in February 2014. The couple had two children and a cat.

Career statistics

Club

International

Scores and results list Turkey's goal tally first, score column indicates score after each Şaş goal.

Honours
Turkey
 FIFA World Cup third place: 2002

Galatasaray
 Turkish League: 1998–99, 1999–2000, 2001–02, 2005–06, 2007–08
 Turkish Cup: 1998–99, 1999–2000, 2004–05
 TSYD Cup: 1998–99, 1999–00
 Turkish Super Cup: 2008
 UEFA Cup: 2000
 UEFA Super Cup: 2000

Individual
 FIFA World Cup All Star Team: 2002

References

External links
 
 

1976 births
Living people
People from Karataş
Sportspeople from Adana
Association football midfielders
Turkish footballers
Turkey international footballers
Turkey under-21 international footballers
Süper Lig players
Adana Demirspor footballers
MKE Ankaragücü footballers
Galatasaray S.K. footballers
2002 FIFA World Cup players
Doping cases in association football
Turkish sportspeople in doping cases
Galatasaray S.K. (football) non-playing staff
Turkish Arab people
UEFA Cup winning players
Turkish football managers